Duckpool to Furzey Cove is a coastal Geological Conservation Review site and Site of Special Scientific Interest (SSSI) in north Cornwall, England, UK, noted for its geological interest.

Geography
It starts at Duckpool near the hamlet of Coombe in the north, following the shores of the Celtic Sea in the Atlantic Ocean, ending at Furzey Cove near Maer in the south.

The South West Coast Path runs through the SSSI and parts of the coastline are owned by the National Trust. This site is contiguous with the Bude Coast, Steeple Point to Marsland Mouth and Marsland to Clovelly Coast (in Devon) chain of SSSIs on this section of coastline.

Geology
The geology of the site mainly is composed of alternating mudstones, shales and siltstones and is of very high national
importance in the study of Upper Carboniferous rocks within Britain.

References

Sites of Special Scientific Interest in Cornwall
Sites of Special Scientific Interest notified in 1996
National Trust properties in Cornwall
Cornish coast